William Lee Golden (born January 12, 1939) is an American country music singer. Between 1965 and 1987, and again since December 1995, he has been the baritone singer in the country vocal group The Oak Ridge Boys.

Career
Golden joined The Oak Ridge Boys (then a Southern gospel music group) in 1965. Golden is widely known for his waist-length beard and hair, and has become one of the most recognizable faces in the entertainment industry. Golden was voted out of The Oak Ridge Boys in 1987, as the other three members wanted to change the band's image. He was replaced by Steve Sanders, but stayed with MCA Records as a solo artist to record an album titled American Vagabond, which included two chart singles. In 1990, he moved to Mercury Records and released "Louisiana Red Dirt Highway".

Sanders left the group in 1995 and Golden returned on New Year's Eve of the same year.

Personal life
Has been married four times.
Golden was married to Frogene Normand from 1957 to 1975. He married Luetta Callaway in 1984 and they divorced in 1987. He was married to Brenda Kaye Hall from 1990 to 2013. Golden married Simone De Staley in 2015. They live in Hendersonville, Tennessee. He has four sons, Rusty, Craig, Chris and Solomon, a step-daughter and seven grandchildren.  Golden's sons Rusty and Chris recorded as The Goldens for Epic Records and Capitol Records between 1988 and 1991. They also played in his road band during his solo career.

The "Golden Era Plantation"

Golden's home is called The "Golden Era Plantation." Built in 1786, it is recognized as the oldest brick home in Sumner County, Tennessee. The Federal-style structure was built in 1786, then called "Pilot's Knob," on a military outpost by American Revolutionary War Captain James Franklin, the father of planter and slave trader Isaac Franklin (1789–1846). After the war, he was awarded a land grant to the property.

During the Civil War, the Plantation became a station camp for Confederate soldiers. In order to protect their valuable gold and silver from approaching Union soldiers, the occupants buried the metals in the ground surrounding the house. This gold was later discovered during renovation of the home in 1976.

The area has been struck twice by tornadoes; once in 1892 and again on April 6, 2006. Originally a two-story building, the second story was removed by the first tornado. Repairs were made leaving it as a single-story home. Following the second tornado, the home's architecture was restored, adding a second story. The home was listed for sale in 2016 following Golden's divorce from Brenda Hall.

Discography

Albums

Singles

Guest singles

Music videos

References

External links

"Biography." William Lee Golden. 25 October 2007.
"Golden Era Plantation." William Lee Golden. 25 October 2007.

1939 births
American country singer-songwriters
American gospel singers
American baritones
Living people
MCA Records artists
Mercury Records artists
People from Brewton, Alabama
People from Hendersonville, Tennessee
The Oak Ridge Boys members
Singer-songwriters from Tennessee
Country musicians from Tennessee
Country musicians from Alabama
American male singer-songwriters
Singer-songwriters from Alabama